A leadership election for the Civic Democratic Party (ODS)  was held on 19 November 1995. Václav Klaus was reelected as party's leader. Klaus ran unopposed and received 259 votes of 272.

References

1995
1995 elections in the Czech Republic
Single-candidate elections
Civic Democratic Party leadership election